D+ is an indie rock band based in Anacortes, Washington.  Formed in 1996 by singer/guitarist Bret Lunsford and singers/multi-instrumentalists Karl Blau and Phil Elverum, the band is perhaps best known for Lunsford's droll vocals and witty wordplay, and a minimalist, ramshackle sound.

Discography

Full length LPs
D+ (Knw-Yr-Own / K Records 1997)
Dandelion Seeds (Knw-Yr-Own / K Records 1998)
Mistake (Knw-Yr-Own 2002)
Deception Pass (Knw-Yr-Own 2003)
No Mystery (P.W. Elverum & Sun 2006)
On Purpose (Knw-Yr-Own 2008) ("hits, rarities, and live cuts")
What is Doubt For? (Knw-Yr-Own 2008)
Destroy Before Listening (Knw-Yr-Own 2018)

Singles
"Book" b/w "Heatherwood" (K Records 1996)

Compilation appearances
"Clever Knot" on "Yeti No. 500"
"Pandora Balks" on Free The Bird: What the Heck Fest Sampler 2006 (Kelp Monthly 2006)
"Red White & Blue Lite" on Flotsam & Jetsam: What the Heck Fest Sampler 2005 (Kelp Monthly 2005)
"Why Oh Why Oh" on What the Heck Fest Sampler 2003 (Knw-Yr-Own 2003)
"Take You For Granted" on Shipwreck Day (Knw-Yr-Own 2002)
"Up and Died" on Remote Wing (Knw-Yr-Own 2001)

Beat Happening
Indie rock musical groups from Washington (state)
K Records artists
Musical groups established in 1996
Musical groups from Anacortes, Washington